Eriodictyon is a genus of plants known by the common name yerba santa within the Hydrophylloideae subfamily of the borage family, Boraginaceae. They are distributed throughout the southwestern United States and Mexico.

Description 
Most species grow as either perennial herbs or shrubs. They grow in a prostrate to ascending or erect stance. The stems are characterized by shredding barking. The leaves are cauline and alternate. The inflorescence is generally open and terminal. The corolla is funnel to urn shaped, and white, lavender or purple, and generally hairy on the abaxial surface. The sexual organs of the plant, including the stamens, filaments, and ovaries, are also generally hairy. The fruits are 1 to 3 mm wide. The fruits are schizocarpic, and not all mericarpids are fertile. The seeds are striated, and colored a dark brown or black.

Taxonomy

Etymology 
It includes California yerba santa (Eriodictyon californica), along with other similarly named plants. Yerba santa means "sacred herb" in the Spanish language. The name Eriodictyon, from the Greek erio + dictyon refers to the wooly surface of the abaxial leaves.

Subdivisions 
There are 11 species native to the southwestern United States and northwestern Mexico. 6 species are used by indigenous peoples.
 Eriodictyon altissimum — Indian Knob mountainbalm
 Eriodictyon angustifolium — Narrow-leaved yerba santa
 Eriodictyon californicum — California yerba santa
 Eriodictyon capitatum — Lompoc yerba santa
 Eriodictyon crassifolium — Thick-leaved yerba santa
 Eriodictyon lobbii — Dwarf yerba santa, also known as Nama lobbii.
 Eriodictyon parryi — Poodle-dog bush
Eriodictyon sessilifolium — Baja California yerba santa
 Eriodictyon tomentosum — Woolly yerba santa
 Eriodictyon traskiae — Pacific yerba santa
 Eriodictyon trichocalyx — Hairy yerba santa

References

External links

USDA Plants Profile: Eriodictyon
Eriodictyon. CalFlora.

 
Boraginaceae genera